Mallard Creek High School is a comprehensive public high school located in Charlotte, North Carolina. It was the 21st high school in the Charlotte-Mecklenburg Schools district. The school opened to 1,200 students on August 27, 2007.

Campus and facilities
Built in the similar style as its sister school, Ardrey Kell High School, Mallard Creek is a three-story, pre-cast concrete building, surrounding a large central courtyard. The school is located near the I-485 belt loop in Mecklenburg County, and the Highland Creek community. The concrete is colored in certain exterior areas to represent the school's colors: navy blue, cardinal red, and Vegas gold. The school has a football stadium (with a turf field), a baseball–softball complex, and a large gymnasium, as well as an adjoining practice gymnasium, tennis courts, and soccer fields. The school shares practice fields and the athletic stadium with nearby Mallard Creek Community Park, and local community athletic groups.

Athletics
Mallard Creek's teams are known as the "Mavericks". The school is a part of the North Carolina High School Athletic Association (NCHSAA) and competes in the I-Meck 4A athletic conference.

The school's football team won the NCHSAA State 4AA Championship in 2013, 2014, and again in 2015. The Men's Track and Field team won its first NCHSAA 4A State Championship in 2015.

Notable alumni
Gabbi Cunningham, Olympic track athlete
Jordan Davis, NFL defensive tackle
D. J. Humphries, NFL offensive tackle
Thaddeus Moss, NFL tight end
Jaylen Samuels, NFL running back
Marquise Williams, football quarterback

References

External links

Public high schools in North Carolina
Schools in Charlotte, North Carolina
2007 establishments in North Carolina
Educational institutions established in 2007